Meghna  Malik is an Indian actress who appears in Hindi television and films. She is popularly known as the high-handed Ammaji of Colors TV's popular show Na Aana Is Des Laado. The show dealt with the issue of female infanticide and other atrocities against women. 

In 2013, Malik became a contestant on Jhalak Dikhhla Jaa. In 2016, she appeared in Star Plus's show Dahleez. In 2017, she reprised her role as Ammaji from Na Aana Is Des Laado in its sequel Laado 2 – Veerpur Ki Mardani, although she quit the show in early 2018.

Early life and family
Malik was born and brought up in Sonipat in a Jat family. Her mother Kamlesh Malik is a retired college principal, while her father Raghuvir Singh Malik (d. 2020) was an English professor. Her younger sister Mimansha is a senior anchor and producer with ZEE News. She completed her Master's degree in English after which she moved to Delhi, where she did an acting course from the National School of Drama, graduating in 1997. She is a Mumbai resident from 2000.

She married film actor Riju Bajaj, the son of theatre director Ram Gopal Bajaj and maternal grandson of music director Khemchand Prakash, in 2000. Her sister, Mimansa Malik, is a television news anchor and journalist.

Career
Malik played the leading role of Ammaji in television series Na Aana Is Des Laado (2009–2012). She also had supporting roles in several movies, including Chalte Chalte, Kuch Naa Kaho, and Taare Zameen Par.

In 2017, she was signed up to reprise her role as Ammaji in Laado 2. She quits the show in 2018, while the show went off air the same year.

Filmography

Television

Films

Web series

Awards
 2010: Gold Awards - Best Actress in Negative Role (Female) - Na Aana Is Des Laado
2022 : 67th Filmfare Awards – Best Supporting Actress Saina (Nominated)

References

External links

Indian television actresses
Living people
Actresses from Haryana
National School of Drama alumni
People from Sonipat
Year of birth missing (living people)